This is a list of episodes from 2021 for the Stuff You Should Know podcast.

2021 season
 Short Stuff (2021)

References

External links 
 Podcast Archive

Lists of radio series episodes